Robert Hobart Davis (1869–1942) was a dramatist, journalist, and photographer from the U.S. He edited Munsey's Magazine from 1904 until 1925 and was a columnist for the New York Sun from 1925 to 1942  The New York Public Library has a collection of his papers. His photographs include portraits of prominent people.

Davis was born in Nebraska to Sylvia Nichols and George Ransome Davis. He grew up in Carson City, Nevada and began his career in newspapers there as a compositor at the Carson City Daily Appeal. He also lived in San Francisco where he reported for the San Francisco Examiner and the Call and Chronicle before moving to New York City in 1895 and joining the New York World and New York Journal. He joined Frank A. Munsey Company papers in 1904.

He was an influence on several authors who became famous and corresponded with many prominent people.

He was part of the Stevenson Society of America.

He interviewed Mussolini in Rome in 1926. He interviewed Angelo Capato.

Bibliography
We Are French! with Perley Poore Sheehan (1914)
The Bugler of Algiers with Perley Poore Sheehan, George H. Doran Company, 1916
Efficiency : a play in one act (1917)Man Makes His Own Mask a book of his photographsOver my left shoulder : a panorama of men and events, burlesques and tragedies, cabbages and kings and sometimes W and Y Bob Davis recalls : Sixty true stories of love and laughter and tears Irvin S. Cobb, storyteller : with biographical particulars and notes on his books and who's Cobb and why? (1924)I Am the Printing Press (1930)Bob Davis at large Tree Toad; the autobiography of a small boyThe caliph of Bagdad : being Arabian nights flashes of the life, letters, and work of O. Henry, William Sydney Porter, co-wrote (1931)People, people everywhere; footprints of a wanderer (1936)
Oriental odyssey; people behind the sun (1937)
Canada cavalcade; the maple leaf dominion from Atlantic to Pacific (1937)
Hawaii, U.S.A. illustrated with photographs with George Thomas Armitage (1941)

Discography
"The Woodchuck Song" (1902), source of the phrase "How much wood would a woodchuck chuck" written for Fay Templeton in the musical 'The Runaways and rewritten by Theodore Morse for a 1904 song.
"Paradox"
"Lady Bountiful", lyrics

Filmography
Whoopee! (film), co-wrote screenplay
The Miracle Man (1932 film), co-wrote screenplay, an adaptation of George M. Cohan's 1914 play.

References

Further reading
The amazing Bob Davis : his last vagabond journey by Fred S Mathias

1869 births
1942 deaths
20th-century American dramatists and playwrights
20th-century American journalists
American male journalists
20th-century American photographers
19th-century American dramatists and playwrights
19th-century American journalists
19th-century American photographers